The Catholic Church in Lebanon is part of the worldwide Catholic Church under the spiritual leadership of the Pope in Rome.

There are about 1.8 million Catholics in Lebanon in total, the majority of whom are not Latin Catholics but instead follow Eastern Catholic rites as part of the Catholic Church - mostly Maronite, but also Melkite as well as Catholic rites non-native to Lebanon like Armenian, Chaldean, and Syriac.

The Maronite Church constitutes the largest Eastern Catholic church represented in both Lebanon, and the Middle East. The "Land of the Cedars", as Lebanon is known, is the only one in the region where Catholics play an active role in national politics. Besides the President of the Republic, which by the Constitution of Lebanon must be a Maronite Catholic, in the Lebanese Parliament there are 43 seats reserved to Catholics out of a total of 128 seats. Catholics are also well represented in the government and in the public life.

Until the 1960s, Catholics were also the major component of the population and represented 43% of all Lebanese. Nowadays, they are considered around 28% of the total population, being Maronites 30%, Melkites 5% and non-native to Lebanon Catholic rites like Armenian Catholics 1%.

Recent history
Muslim and Christian communities coexist in the country for centuries. Cohabitation was sanctioned by a National Pact in 1943, which created a democracy based on religious communities. The country became a good example of religious and ethnic coexistence. But that lasted only a few decades. 
The larger communities, Christian and Muslim, were upset by the long Lebanese Civil War that raged between 1975 and 1990. The religious geography of the capital Beirut was redrawn: 65,000 Shiite Muslims abandoned their neighborhoods, and Nabaa chout; from interior regions, in contrast, to the capital flowed 80,000 Maronites and Druzes. As a result of the Civil War, West Beirut was progressively abandoned by Christians. Also, a mass exodus fleeing saw tens of thousands of civilians, including Christians, Druze and Sunni Muslims.

Not enough internal upheavals, during this period, tens of thousands of Palestinian refugees entered the country. At the end of the Lebanese Civil War, Christians, by majority, were discovered minority.

In 1995 it was held a Special Assembly of Bishops for the Lebanon, convened by Pope John Paul II in Rome.

Territory and statistics
Since 1954 the Holy See has its own seat in Lebanon, the Apostolic Vicariate of Beirut. with 15,000 Latin Catholics, 161 priests and 8 parishes in 2010. There are 1,382,400 Catholics in Lebanon (mainly Eastern Catholics), with 23 episcopal sees, 1,603 priests and 1,253 parishes belonging to the six Catholic rites.

Rites of the Catholic Church in Lebanon
In addition to the Latin Church in Lebanon there are five other Catholic Churches sui iuris. Each is characterized by a liturgical rite specific differences. Among them, the main in Lebanon is the Syro-Antiochene. The Catholic Antiochian Rite form two distinct groups: the Maronite Church (main Catholic religious branch in Lebanon)  and Syriac Catholic Church. Both churches have their patriarchal see in Lebanon. However, the Melkite Greek Catholic Church (second most important Catholic branch in Lebanon), Armenian Catholic Church and Chaldean Catholic Church are also present.

Religious institute (orders) 
List of religious institutes that have their mother house in Lebanon:

Maronite 
 Baladites Official website of the Lebanese Maronite Order
 Antonins  Official website of the Lebanese Antonin Order 
 Aleppians Official Website of the Mariamite Maronite Order (O.M.M.)
 Kreimists or Lebanese missionaries Official website of the Congregation of Maronite Lebanese Missionaries

Melkite Catholic 
Basilian Chouerite Order
Basilian Salvatorian Order
Basilian Alepian Order
 Congregazione dei Sacri Cuori di Gesù e di Maria
 Francescane della Croce del Libano
 Istituto del Clero Patriarcale di Bzommar
 Monache Maronite
 Ordine Basiliano di San Giovanni Battista
 Suore Basiliane Aleppine
 Congrégation des Soeurs Basiliennes Chouérites
 Suore Salvatoriane dell'Annunciazione

See also
Apostolic Nunciature to Lebanon
Christianity in Lebanon
Lebanese people (Maronite Christians)
Lebanese people (Melkite Christians)
Lebanese people (Greek Orthodox Christians)
Lebanese people (Protestant Christians)
Latin Church in Lebanon
French people in Lebanon
Italians in Lebanon
List of Saints from Asia

References

 
Lebanon